Christian Miller (born June 16, 1996) is an American football outside linebacker who is currently a free agent. He played college football at Alabama.

College career
Miller was a team captain and a member of 2 College Football Playoff National Championship teams as well as 4 SEC Championship teams while with the Crimson Tide. A four-star recruit and the top ranked player in the state of South Carolina heading into Alabama, Miller was primarily used as an outside linebacker in college, although coach Nick Saban sometimes experimented with him at inside linebacker in practice due to his versatility.
Miller's junior season was widely hampered by injuries, but was highlighted with a sack in the 2017 College Football Playoff National Championship. In his senior season, Miller was a consistent threat off the edge recording 8.5 sacks. In week 3, Miller was named SEC Defensive Player of the Week after recording 2.5 sacks and 5 total tackles against the Ole Miss Rebels. Unfortunately, Miller strained his hamstring in the 2018 Orange Bowl and missed the 2019 College Football Playoff National Championship game due to the injury.

Professional career
At the 2019 NFL Scouting Combine, Miller recorded a 38.5-inch vertical jump and had the longest arm length measured for a linebacker at 35 1/8.

Carolina Panthers
Miller was drafted by the Carolina Panthers in the fourth round (115th overall) of the 2019 NFL Draft.

In week 3 against the Arizona Cardinals, Miller recorded his first 2 career sacks on fellow rookie Kyler Murray in the 38–20 win.

On August 3, 2020, Miller announced he would opt out of the 2020 season due to the COVID-19 pandemic.

On August 31, 2021, Miller was waived by the Panthers.

Personal life
Miller's father, Corey Miller, was a nine-year NFL veteran who spent time with the New York Giants and Minnesota Vikings.

References

External links
Alabama Crimson Tide bio

1996 births
Living people
American football linebackers
Alabama Crimson Tide football players
Carolina Panthers players
Players of American football from Columbia, South Carolina